Giffoni Sei Casali is a town and comune in the province of Salerno in the Campania region of south-western Italy.

History
The communal seat, Capitignano, appeared when the Romans destroyed Picentia, whose inhabitants took refuge  on the mountains nearby. The modern name, according to tradition, would derive from Caput Jani ("Janus' head"), referring to the head of statue of the god which they brought to the new site.

Capitignano was part of the Kingdom of Two Sicilies until 1860, as part of the district of Salerno.

Geography
The municipality is situated in a hill zone by the Picentini mountain range. It borders with the municipalities of Calvanico, Castiglione del Genovesi, Fisciano, Giffoni Valle Piana and San Cipriano Picentino.

Giffoni is divided into four frazioni, Capitignano being the administrative seat. The other are Malche, Prepezzano and Sieti.

See also
Monti Picentini
Giffoni Valle Piana
Giffoni Film Festival

References

External links

Official website 

Cities and towns in Campania